The 2005 FC Moscow season was the club's 2nd season in existence after taking over the licence of Torpedo-Metallurg in 2004. They finished the season in 5th place, qualifying for the UEFA Intertoto Cup for the first time. In the 2004–05 Russian Cup, Moscow reached the Round of 16, whilst in the 2005–06 Russian Cup they progressed to the Round of 16 which took place during the 2006 season.

Squad

On loan

Left club during season

Transfers

In

Out

Loans out

Released

Competitions

Premier League

Results by round

Results

League table

Russian Cup

2004–05

2005–06

The Round of 16 games took place during the 2006 season.

Squad statistics

Appearances and goals

|-
|colspan="14"|Players away from the club on loan:

|-
|colspan="14"|Players who appeared for Moscow but left during the season:

|}

Goal scorers

Clean sheets

Disciplinary record

References

FC Moscow seasons
Moscow